Alberton was a railway station on the South Gippsland line, which originally terminated at  in South Gippsland, Victoria. The station was opened on 13 January 1892, and closed on 6 June 1981. Alberton was the junction for the extension of the South Gippsland line to Woodside in the early 1920s. The line between Alberton and Port Albert closed in the 1940s.

References 

Disused railway stations in Victoria (Australia)
Transport in Gippsland (region)
Shire of Wellington